Edmund Leslie Newcombe,  (February 17, 1859 – December 9, 1931) was a Canadian lawyer, civil servant, and Puisne Justice of the Supreme Court of Canada.

Early life
Born in Cornwallis, Nova Scotia, the son of John Cumming Newcombe and Abigail H. Calkin, he received a Bachelor of Arts degree in 1878 and a Master of Arts degree in 1881 from Dalhousie University. He received a Bachelor of Laws degree in 1881 from the short-lived University of Halifax.

Career
In 1882, he was called to the Nova Scotia Bar and started to practise law.

In 1893, he became Deputy Minister of Justice and was called to the Ontario Bar, and was appointed Queen's Counsel shortly after. As Deputy Minister, he was responsible for all the legal work of the Canadian government.  He frequently appeared in person in front of the Supreme Court of Canada and the Judicial Committee of the Privy Council, appearing in more than thirty cases in front of the latter. He was appointed CMG in 1909.

In 1924, he was appointed to the Supreme Court and served until his death in 1931.

References

External links
 Supreme Court of Canada biography

Justices of the Supreme Court of Canada
Canadian Companions of the Order of St Michael and St George
19th-century Canadian civil servants
20th-century Canadian civil servants
Schulich School of Law alumni
Canadian Presbyterians
1859 births
1931 deaths
Canadian King's Counsel